One Wet Season is a 1949 book by Ion Idriess about life in the Kimberley region of Western Australia during the wet season of 1934. The book records true stories of the lives of the pioneers and Aboriginals of the Kimberley, centring predominantly on those living in the King Leopold Ranges and spending the wet season in the town of Derby, Western Australia.

References

External links
Chapter one of serialisation of book
One Wet Season at AustLit
Serialised in Western Herald - 20 April, 27 April, 4 May, 11 May, 18 May, 25 May, 1 June, 8 June, 15 June,  22 June, 29 June, 6 July, 13 July, 20 July, 3 August, 10 August

1949 non-fiction books
Australian non-fiction books
Kimberley (Western Australia)
Books by Ion Idriess
1934 in Australia
Angus & Robertson books